Reishia keluo is a species of sea snail, a marine gastropod mollusk, in the family Muricidae, the murex snails or rock snails.

References

 Claremont, M., Vermeij, G. J., Williams, S. T. & Reid, D. G. (2013). Global phylogeny and new classification of the Rapaninae (Gastropoda: Muricidae), dominant molluscan predators on tropical rocky seashores. Molecular Phylogenetics and Evolution. 66: 91–102.

External links
 Tan, K.-S. & Liu, L.-L. (2001). Description of a new species of Thais (Mollusca: Neogastropoda: Muricidae) from Taiwan, based on morphological and allozyme analyses. Zoological Science. 18(9): 1275-1289

keluo
Gastropods described in 2001